On 11 June 2017, a Molotov cocktail was thrown in a restaurant in Aubervilliers, a suburb of northern Paris in France. The attack injured 12 people, including six policemen, and caused a large blaze of the five-storey block the restaurant was part of. It happened on the day of French parliamentary elections.

See also
June 2017 Champs-Élysées car ramming attack
Sept-Sorts car attack

References 

21st century in Île-de-France
Attacks on restaurants in Europe
June 2017 crimes in Europe
June 2017 events in France
Crime in Île-de-France